Than To is a district (amphoe) in southern Yala province, Thailand.

History
The tambon Mae Wat was separated from Bannang Sata district on 9 June 1975 and formed the new minor district (king amphoe) Than To. It was upgraded to a full district on 13 July 1981.

The area had been the site of the Than To Prison of the Corrections Department. The prison was established in 1935 for political prisoners. It was closed in 1957. Later the government converted the area to Than To Estate.

Geography
Neighboring districts are (from the north clockwise): Bannang Sata of Yala Province; Si Sakhon of Narathiwat province; Betong of Yala Province; and Kedah state of Malaysia.

Administration

Central administration 
The district Than To is subdivided into 4 subdistricts (Tambon), which are further subdivided into 37 administrative villages (Muban).

Local administration 
There is one subdistrict municipality (Thesaban Tambon) in the district:
 Khok Chang consisting of parts of the subdistrict Mae Wat.

There are 4 subdistrict administrative organizations (SAO) in the district:
 Than To consisting of the complete subdistrict Than To.
 Ban Rae consisting of the complete subdistrict Ban Rae.
 Mae Wat consisting of parts of the subdistrict Mae Wat.
 Khiri Khet consisting of the complete subdistrict Khiri Khet.

References

External links
amphoe.com

Districts of Yala province